Shankar Mahadevan (3 March 1967) is an Indian playback singer and music composer. Best known for his work in Hindi, Tamil, Telugu, Kannada and Malayalam films. He has also recorded songs for many non-film albums, tel-series, devotionals and classical.

Shankar shot to fame through his 1998 released private album Breathless . In Tamil, Telugu, Malayalam and Kannada films, he initially rose to fame through A. R. Rahman compositions and eventually recorded many hundreds of songs for composers.

This is only a partial list; Shankar has sung over 7000 songs.

Non South film songs

1990s

2000s

2010s

2020s

South Movie Songs

Albums/singles

Tamil songs

1990s

2000s

2010s

2020s

Telugu songs

1994

1995

1998

1999

2000

2001

2002

2003

2004

2005

2006

2007

2008

2009

2010

2011

2012

2013

2014

2015

2016

2017

2018

2019

2020

2021

2022

Kannada songs

1990s

2000s

2010s

2020s

Malayalam songs

Marathi songs

Tulu Songs

Non-film songs

Album 
 1998 Breathless

Television title songs 
 1999 Nimmathi Ungal Choice-Part II Manasatchi (Tamil)
 2000 Vaazhkai  (Tamil)
 2008 Shivasakthi (duet with Swetha Mohan) (Tamil)

References 

Lists of songs recorded by Indian singers